Ballindoon Friary was a Dominican priory beside Lough Arrow in County Sligo, Ireland. It was dedicated to St. Mary and founded in 1507 by Thomas O'Farrell. It was dissolved  and is now in ruins.

See also
 List of abbeys and priories in Ireland (County Sligo)

References

Dominican monasteries in Ireland
Buildings and structures in County Sligo
Ruins in Ireland
1507 establishments in Ireland
1580s disestablishments in Ireland
Religious organizations established in the 1500s
Religion in County Sligo
Christian monasteries established in the 16th century